Hisarköy ('fortress village')  is a Turkish place name and it may refer to:

Hisarköy, Ağlasun
Hisarköy, Burhaniye
Hisarköy, Kurucaşile a village in Kurucaşile district of Bartın Province
Hisarköy, Ulus a village in Ulus district of Bartın Province
Hisarköy, Mut a village in Mut district of Mersin Province
Hisarköy, Emirdağ a village in Emirdağ district of Afyonkarahisar Province, the location of ancient and Byzantine Amorium
Hisarköy, Sarayköy
Hisarköy, Girne a village in Girne district of Northern Cyprus